Purnim  is a small town in Victoria, Australia.

Purnim Post Office opened on 1 November 1868.

Buildings of interest are the Purnim Hotel, Purnim Mechanics Institute hall (built in 1901), the Australian rules football oval, the  primary school, and a church.

Purnim has a cricket team that formerly competed in  Grassmere Cricket Association, but changed its name to the Northern Raiders  and now competes in the Warrnambool District Cricket Association.

Traditional ownership
The formally recognised traditional owners for the area in which Purnim sits are the Eastern Maar people, who are represented by the Eastern Maar Aboriginal Corporation (EMAC).

References

Towns in Victoria (Australia)
Western District (Victoria)